Jack Snyder and Carly Tenney Snyder are fictional characters who are a supercouple from the American daytime drama As the World Turns. Jack is portrayed by Michael Park, and Carly is portrayed by Maura West. The fictional couple has been nicknamed by the portmanteau "CarJack" (for Carly and Jack) on internet message boards.

Storyline 
 Jack and Carly met in Carly's native state Montana. After breaking up with Carly, Jack met Julia Lindsey. While helping Julia escape from her controlling fiancé, he developed feelings for her. During this time Jack also discovered that Carly have married Hal, to gain a trust fund from her estranged half sister, Rosanna Cabot. Hal eventually discovered the truth on his own and divorced Carly.

 Carly married Jack's brother, Brad, though she did not love him. Brad blackmailed her to do as he said by threatening to tell that Parker was really Hal's son, and not John Dixon's. Carly's cousin Molly had switched the paternity results, so that Carly could obtain the trust fund. Chemistry between Jack and Carly remained strong. Jack's relationship with Julia ended due to dishonesty and interference from Carly.

 Carly lost everything, including custody of her son. Jack took pity on her and befriended her, despite all that had happened. Jack wanted to attempt a romantic relationship with Carly again, but stipulated that there could be no more lies between them. He made a bet with her that she could not go three months without lying. When she won the bet, he took her to a section of land that he had purchased for them to build their dream home on, and proposed. They named the land Carly's Prize.

 In 2001, Julia miscarried Jack's baby and Jack confessed that he still loved Carly. Jack tried to be faithful, but was drawn to Carly and created excuses to meet with her. Jack's feelings for Carly drove Julia insane, and eventually led her to kill Carly's horse, Flashdance. Jack became concerned about Julia's mental state and eventually uncovered the truth about the horse. He urged Julia to check herself into an institution and hid her crimes, blaming himself for her mental state. Jack would not commit to Carly due to his guilt over being responsible for Julia's state of mind. 
 Carly mysteriously disappeared along with Emily Stewart and Rose D'Angelo.  The three had been kidnapped by evil mastermind, James Stenbeck and held hostage at a spa.  Jack pursued false leads for months and was even stopped from leaving the country by Julia (hired by James) who kidnapped, tortured and raped Jack until Craig and Simon caught on to what was going on.  Julia got away but they saved Jack.  Jack finally made a deal with James. The deal was that James would let Carly go in exchange for his ex-wife Barbara Ryan. Carly was released, Barbara was able to get away and James fled from the law. Jack saved Carly once again.  But, due to skin treatments at the spa, Carly looked decades older. Not wanting her to deal with everyone's reaction, Jack had her secretly transferred to Memorial hospital.  Jack loved Carly from the inside and her look did not affect him.  The same could not be said for Craig who turned to Rosanna after he saw what had become of Carly.  Eventually, Carly was released from the hospital and went to live with Parker and Jacks house.  Carly felt Jack's unconditional love.
 On the day of Jack and Carly's Halloween wedding, Julia returned to town with a baby, Jack Jr., claiming he was Jack's and a product of the incident in which Julia drugged and raped him.  Though the paternity test confirmed this, later it was discovered that the child was stolen by Julia in an attempt to further torture Jack, and was returned to his biological parents.
 Though the marriage started on happy note with Carly expecting their baby, it soured when Jack learned about the night Carly spent with Mike before their wedding, and that the baby might not be his after all.  Because Carly went missing and it slipped Jacks mind, their divorce had gone through, and Jack was devastated.  He wanted a life with Carly, Parker and Sage.  He asked Carly to marry him again and with only slight hesitation (not knowing yet if Sage was his daughter), Carly said yes.  Jack and Carly finally renewed their vows in the place where they had met all those years ago.  Later, Jack and Carly learned that Sage was Jack's daughter after all.  It seemed like a happily ever after storybook ending, until.

 After it appeared that Jack had died, Carly refused to believe Jack was dead and began to look into the accident.  Although it seemed hopeless, Carly had one small lead—a dark-haired woman at the water park with a small child named JJ was at the park with the blurred man in the photo.  Her luck changed when a report came in that Jack Snyder's wallet had been stolen.  It was proof that Jack was alive.  Carly soon got wind and began her own investigation to find her husband.  But throughout the weeks the search proved fruitless.  Finally, Parker (who had been having psychic flashes throughout all of this) told Carly that it was too late and then collapsed.  Fearing what this was doing to her son, Carly decided to give up the search.  But that all changed when Carly learned that the dark-haired woman from the water park had been in her house wanting to tell her something.  The same day, Parker found a pen in the trash, which must have been left by the dark haired woman, a pen from St. Genevieve Hospital.  Now with a solid lead, Carly and Rosanna did some searching and found out the woman's identity—Julia Larrabee.

 While bonding with Julia and JJ, Jack would periodically get flashes of a vivacious blonde but had no idea what those flashes meant and how they related to the crazy woman who tried to kill him. After being told that Julia had a job offer, Jack agreed to the move.  After driving all night, Jack and his new family stopped at a hotel called the White Horse.

 A few months later, Carly started having nightmares of a woman screaming at her demanding to know what she had done to her child.  Convinced this was a traumatic childhood memory, Carly did some digging through her father's things and found a photo of him and a dark-haired woman.  The odd thing was that the photo was taken near Mabel's in Oakdale.  Confused since her father never mentioned living there, Carly asked around, but no one remembered her father or the woman he was with.  Trying to support her, Jack did some digging and found out who the woman was and her relationship to Carly.  Determined that Carly would never learn the truth, Jack located the woman, Iris, in Oakdale and went to her to tell her to stay away.  Unfortunately, Carly saw them talking.  To Jack's relief, Iris simply told Carly that she dated her father when Carly was a girl.

 Meanwhile, tragedy struck when Rosanna was run off the road by Craig and fell into a coma.  At the time of the accident, Rosanna had made plans to adopt a baby boy from a teenage unwed mother.  With Rosanna incapacitated, Carly decided to raise her sister's baby, whom she named Rory, after Rosanna. Unfortunately, the mother, Gwen Norbeck, decided to sue the Snyders for custody since she didn't know or trust Carly.  A week later, at the trial, Iris told Carly the secret she had been hiding.  She had given birth to Carly's father, Ray Tenney's, child and Carly, in a childhood pique of jealousy, murdered her newborn baby.  Since Carly was underage, the records were sealed.  When Carly relayed the story to Jack, he was forced to admit that he'd not only seen the juvenile records; he'd destroyed them.  As for Carly, all she remembered was a small baby and Iris screaming that she'd killed him.  In the meantime, the custody battle seemed to be turning in Gwen's favor with her getting visitation rights.

 Carly then moved on to a flirtatious relationship with new business partner, Simon Frasier.  A jealous Jack realized how much he missed his soulmate.  Carly then refused to take Jack back and entered a serious relationship with Simon.

 Carly and Simon end up stealing some crown jewels and go on the run, they leave Oakdale, but Carly returns to say goodbye to the children.  Jack is there and catches them, but allows Carly and Simon to leave, still in love with her and deciding to set her free.  After Carly is gone, a bitter and lonely Jack got involved with Katie.  Carly later returns, missing her old life, returning the jewels and leaving Simon.  Now Parker is upset with Carly and after a series of events he runs away.  After repeated attempts to get Carly to understand that he was tired of hurting over and over and wanting to move on with Katie, Jack finally told Carly that he could see himself marrying Katie.  Carly soon manipulated Katie into believing Jack was going to propose to her, but it backfired on her when Katie and Jack realized what Katie and Brad were up to.

 Carly then began having dizzy spells and fainting.  She fainted on a couch while listening to Jack and Katie argue about having more children, was discovered, and neither the believed her story that she fell asleep.  She faints again while trying to convince Katie that she was not following her.  Jack and his brother, Brad, come upon the scene and Jack lectures Carly about getting up to her old tricks.  Brad thinks that something might be wrong with Carly, but she tells him to keep it quiet.  As Carly drives Sage to Jack and Katie's wedding shower, she gets dizzy, sees a flash of white light, and drives off the road.  Nobody is hurt in the accident, but Jack is forced to leave the shower and is upset that Carly crashed with Sage in the car. He is even more upset when she will not give him a reason for the accident.  After Jack leaves, the doctor tells Carly that he thinks she should see a neurologist.

 The next day, Carly goes to the neurologist, and he tells her that she has a lesion, a tumor, or her brain.  Because of the position of the tumor, they cannot operate.  He gives her two months to live and says that there is nothing they can do for her.  Carly goes home, takes a bath, and slides under the water.  Brad finds Carly and pulls her out of the tub.  She admits to him that she is dying, but refuses to let him tell Jack until after his honeymoon.  Together, Carly and Brad call other doctors, but they all confirm that Carly has a tumor, and nothing can be done.

 On the day of Jack and Katie's wedding, Carly collapses in Old Town and for a moment can't remember who she is.  A police officer recognizes her as Jack's ex-wife and takes her to the police station.  He tells her that unless she calls someone to get her, he will call Jack.  Carly calls Brad and his phone rings, interrupting the ceremony.  He tells Jack that he has to leave, and asks them to wait for him to come back.  He goes to get Carly at the police station and brings her to the hospital.

 Jack decides that he doesn't want to wait for Brad, and the ceremony continues.  He and Katie are married, and the reception begins.  Just before Jack and Katie are going to leave for the honeymoon, Katie throws the bouquet, and a returning Brad catches it.  Jack is angry with Brad for leaving until he mentions that something is wrong with Carly.  Jack thinks it is just a trick until Brad confesses that Carly is in the hospital and refuses treatment.  Jack relays the news to Katie and then leaves to go see Carly in the hospital.  When he arrives, Carly is upset that Brad told her secret, but finally admits to Jack that she is dying.  She breaks down and the two embrace as Katie watches from outside the room.

 Jack and Katie put the honeymoon on hold and Jack tells Katie that he needs to spend more time with Carly.  Meanwhile, a suspicious Parker asks Brad why Jack and Katie aren't on their honeymoon and guesses that it has something to do with Carly.  When Brad won't tell him anything, he goes to Katie, who confesses that something is wrong with Carly, but she can't tell him.  She promises him he will find out by the next day.  With this information, Jack and Carly decide that they have to tell the kids.  Brad and Katie bring Parker, J.J., and Sage to Carly's house and she and Jack tell them that Carly is sick and is going to be in and out of the hospital a lot.  Sage and J.J. take the news well, but Parker knows that it is more serious.  After the others leave, Parker tells Carly that he can handle the whole truth.  Carly tearfully tells him that she is not going to get better.

 Later that night, Carly wants Jack to help her make a video for the kids to watch after she dies.  He does, and after he leaves Carly makes a video for him, confessing her love and her desire for him to live a happy life.  A few days later, Jack accidentally sees the video and Carly confirms that it was all true.  She tells Jack that she just wants one more chance to feel loved and asks for one last kiss.  Jack obliges, and he realizes that he still has feelings for Carly.  Jack goes home to Katie and tells her what happened.  She is upset and suggests that they should take a break.  Jack doesn't want to do that, but Katie says that she can't stand not knowing when he is coming home and knowing that he is with Carly.  She tells him to put her first and asks him to move out, which he does regretfully.

 During the final week of the show, Jack and Carly remarry and learn that they are expecting a baby.

Impact 
Jack and Carly were nominated as "Most Irresistible Combination" at the 32nd Daytime Emmy Awards.

On 27 June 2010 actor Maura West and Michael Park who portray Carly and Jack both won Emmy awards for Outstanding Lead Actress (West's second) and Outstanding Lead Actor (Park's first).

On 18 June 2011 actor Michael Park won his second Emmy award for Outstanding Lead Actor.

See also 
List of supercouples

References

External links
SoapCentral

As the World Turns characters
Soap opera supercouples